Shorea ladiana is a species of plant in the family Dipterocarpaceae. It is endemic to Borneo.

References

ladiana
Endemic flora of Borneo
Trees of Borneo
Taxonomy articles created by Polbot